P. W. Inskeep House is a historic home located near Moorefield, Hardy County, West Virginia. It was built in 1876, and is a two-story brick dwelling with a combination of Greek Revival and Gothic Revival styles. Also on the property is a contributing shed / garage.

It was listed on the National Register of Historic Places in 1985.

References

Houses on the National Register of Historic Places in West Virginia
Greek Revival houses in West Virginia
Gothic Revival architecture in West Virginia
Houses completed in 1876
Houses in Hardy County, West Virginia
National Register of Historic Places in Hardy County, West Virginia
1876 establishments in West Virginia